The Somali wild ass (Equus africanus somaliensis) is a subspecies of the African wild ass.

It is found in Somalia, the Southern Red Sea region of Eritrea, and the Afar Region of Ethiopia. The legs of the Somali wild ass are striped, resembling those of its relative, the zebra.

Current distribution and habitat
There are likely fewer than 1,000 animals (or even 700) in the wild and the IUCN Red List of endangered species described it as "critically endangered". This means they face an extremely high risk of extinction in the wild.

A few hundred specimens live in Somalia, Somaliland, Eritrea and Ethiopia.

Reproduction
Somali wild asses typically give birth in the spring, a common characteristic among equids, after a year-long gestation. Within hours, the foal is up on its legs and keeping up with its mother. At around five days old, the foal is already nibbling grass. By the time its two weeks old, the foal is grazing regularly, however, still depending on its mother's milk for fluids. The foal is weaned by 12 to 14 months, but still stays close to its mother, only leaving to play or feed with the other foals in the herd.

Behavior
Due to the limited resources found in their habitat, somali wild Asses live in a fission-fusion society. Most adults live alone, but sometimes form small herds consisting of females and their young. In areas that have more resources, or have more rain, they will sometimes fuse together to form larger temporary herds. Stallions can maintain territories as large as nine square miles. They frequently leave dung piles as markers to remind them of their territory's boundaries. While females are welcome in their territories, stallions will often fight other males who try to mate with females in their territories. However, stallions have been observed allowing males into their territories for grazing, as long as they show no interest in his harem.

Captivity

Global population
, there were about 200 individuals in captivity around the globe living in 34 zoos, as well as three animals (as of 2009) in the Yotvata Hai-Bar Nature Reserve in Israel, to the north of Eilat.  The international studbook is managed by Tierpark Berlin.

Zoo Basel

The leading zoo for breeding this rare ass is Zoo Basel, Switzerland. Its breeding program manages the European studbook for the Somali wild ass and coordinates the European Endangered Species Programme (EEP) – as well as the global species committee of the Somali Wild Ass since 2004.

Zoo Basel started keeping Somali wild asses in 1970 and had its first birth in 1972.  Since then, 11 stallions and 24 females (as of 2009) were born and survived childhood. Today, all Somali wild donkeys in captivity are related to the original group at Zoo Basel.

As of January 18, 2012, there are four Somali wild donkeys in Basel: The stallion "Gigolo" (3) and three females (among them "Yogala"-14).

France
Since 1987, the Réserve Africaine de Sigean, in the south of France, has had a number of Somali wild asses, with births occurring regularly, including two on June 30, 2010, and March 29, 2013.

United States
Only five institutions breed Somali wild ass in the United States: Dallas Zoo, St. Louis Zoo, San Diego Zoo Safari Park, Zoo Miami, and White Oak Conservation in Yulee, Florida. White Oak received a herd in 2008 as part of an international effort to save Somali wild ass from extinction. Since then, the herd has produced 18 foals, including several born in spring 2013. The Dallas Zoo has just had two Somali wild ass foals, both female, one born July 9 and the other on July 19, 2017.  The St. Louis Zoo's most recent birth was on July 30, 2019.

The San Diego Zoo Safari Park is home to eleven Somali Wild Asses, the largest population of Somali Wild Asses in North America. The park received its first herd from the Basel Zoo in 1981. Their first foal was born in 1986. Since then, 49 foals have been born, the most recent being a female born on March 17, 2018. San Diego Zoo Global also works to help save this endangered species in the wild.

Domestication

Domestic donkeys found in Italy are typically descended from the Somali wild ass, as opposed to those from other European countries where domesticated stock are usually descended from the Nubian wild ass.

Conservation
A conservation project (mainly supported by Zoo Basel) in Eritrea counted (before 2014) 47 Somali wild asses living in the mountains between the Buri Peninsula and the Dallol Depression, which is within the larger Danakil Depression, near Eritrea's border with Ethiopia.

As mentioned above, a protected population of the Somali wild ass exists in the Yotvata Hai-Bar Nature Reserve. This Israeli reserve was established in 1968 with the view to bolster populations of endangered desert species.

Notes

References
 Moehlman, Patricia D. (ed). 2002. Equids: Zebras, Asses, and Horses: Status Survey and Conservation Action Plan. Gland, Switzerland: IUCN/SCC Equid Specialist Group

External links

 St. Louis Zoo: Somali Wild Ass
 What's the Zoo to do with its wild ass problem?  St. Louis Post-Dispatch, accessed April 12, 2017
 Somali wild ass at Al Wabra Wildlife Preserve

African wild ass
Herbivorous mammals
Mammals described in 1884
Mammals of Eritrea
Mammals of Ethiopia
Mammals of Somalia